Copelatus iguelaensis is a species of diving beetle. It is part of the genus Copelatus of the subfamily Copelatinae in the family Dytiscidae. It was described by Bilardo & Rocchi in 2002.

References

iguelaensis
Beetles described in 2002